Paul Brannen (born 13 September 1962) is a British Labour Party politician. He is a former Member of the European Parliament (MEP) for the North East England region: he was elected in 2014 and lost his seat in 2019.

Early life
Brannen was brought up in Tyneside, North East England. He attended the University of Leeds, where he studied theology and religious studies. Being involved in student politics, he became President of the Leeds University Union. Brannen also holds an MBA from Durham University Business School.

Political career and activism
After university, Brannen worked for the Anti-Apartheid Movement, leading the campaign against executions by the apartheid government in South Africa. He famously interrupted a press conference being held by Mike Gatting to announce his plans to lead a rebel cricket tour to South Africa in breach of the international sporting boycott. He later moved to Christian Aid, where he led campaigns on poverty and, more recently, climate change. Brannen served five years as a Councillor on Newcastle City Council. He has twice stood for election as a Member of Parliament; for Berwick-upon-Tweed in 1997, and for Hexham in 2001. He was unsuccessful at both elections having come second.

European Parliament
Brannen stood in the 2014 European Parliament election as a Labour Party candidate for the North East England region. With Labour having won the most votes in the region, he was elected a Member of the European Parliament. On 1 July 2014, he was elected to the Committee on Agriculture and Rural Development.

He supported Owen Smith in the 2016 Labour Party (UK) leadership election.

References

External links
Personal website

1962 births
Living people
Labour Party (UK) MEPs
MEPs for England 2014–2019
Alumni of the University of Leeds
Labour Party (UK) parliamentary candidates